The Vereinsthaler was the currency of Prussia between 1857 and 1873. It replaced the Thaler at par and was replaced by the Mark at a rate of 1 Vereinsthaler = 3 Mark. The Vereinsthaler was subdivided into 30 Silbergroschen, each of 12 Pfennings.

Literature 
 William Arthur Shaw (1896). The History of Currency, 1252 to 1896. New York: G.P. Putnam's Sons; London: Clement Wilson.

References

Currencies of Germany
1857 establishments in Germany
1873 disestablishments in Germany
19th-century economic history
Economy of Prussia